Hopewell is an unincorporated community in Cherokee County, Alabama, United States. It lies at an elevation of 587 feet (179 m).

References

Unincorporated communities in Cherokee County, Alabama
Unincorporated communities in Alabama